"Our Fragile Intellect" is a 2012 article by American biochemist Gerald Crabtree, published in the journal Trends in Genetics. Crabtree's speculative and controversial thesis argues that human intelligence peaked sometime between 2,000 and 6,000 years ago and has been in steady decline since the advent of agriculture and increasing urbanization. Modern humans, according to Crabtree, have been losing their intellectual and emotional abilities due to accumulating gene mutations that are not being selected against as they once were in our hunter-gatherer past. This theory is sometimes referred to as the Idiocracy hypothesis.

Thesis
Crabtree argues that advancements in modern science allow new predictions to be made about both the past and the future of humanity and we can predict "that our intellectual and emotional abilities are genetically surprisingly fragile". Recent studies of genes correlated with human intelligence on the X chromosome indicate typical intellectual and emotional activity depends on 10% of genes. Intelligence-dependent (ID) genes appear to be widely distributed throughout the entire genome, leading to a figure of 2,000 and 5,000 genes responsible for our cognitive abilities. Deleterious mutations in these genes can impact normal intellectual and emotional functioning in humans. It is thought that in just the last 120 generations (3000 years), humans have received two or more harmful mutations to these genes, or one every 20-50 generations.

Several counterarguments are presented. The Flynn effect, for example, shows an apparent increase in IQ around the world since 1930. Crabtree attributes the rise in IQ to advancements in environmental and public health measures as well as improved education and other factors. The Flynn effect also shows, argues Crabtree, not an increase in intelligence, but more intelligent test taking.

Reception
Kevin Mitchell, associate professor at the Smurfit Institute of Genetics at Trinity College Dublin agreed that genetic mutations could harm the development of the brain in humans and diminish intelligence; new mutations would become apparent in new generations.  However, Mitchell criticizes Crabtree for failing to acknowledge the role of natural selection.  According to Mitchell, natural selection "definitely has the ability to weed out new mutations that significantly impair intellectual ability".   Mitchell describes Crabtree's argument as a conceptual fallacy and says Crabtree is "thinking about things in a wrong way".

Biologist Steve Jones, Emeritus Professor of Genetics at University College London questioned the journal's decision to publish the paper, calling the study "a classic case of Arts Faculty science. Never mind the hypothesis, give me the data, and there aren’t any".  Crabtree acknowledges that the data isn't there because a slow genetic deterioration in intelligence can't be detected by comparing it to people today.  Instead, Crabtree argues that he is synthesizing already existing data and making a purely mathematical argument that estimates the probability of the number of new mutations that could result in cognitive deficits in future generations.

Anthropologist Robin Dunbar at Oxford University argues against Crabtree's position that brain size was driven by tool use.  Instead, Dunbar argues that the social environment drives intelligence. "In reality what has driven human and primate brain evolution is the complexity of our social world", says Dunbar.  "That complex world is not going to go away. Doing things like deciding who to have as a mate or how best to rear your children will be with us forever."

Cultural trope
Writer Andrew Brown notes that Crabtree's paper represents a familiar, reoccurring notion in both fiction and evolutionary biology.  "The idea that civilised man is a degenerate and self-domesticated variation on the wild type is partly a cultural trope, a result of the anxieties of industrialised life," writes Brown.  The idea,  Brown observes, was popular in the early 20th century fiction of E. M. Forster ("The Machine Stops") and Jack London (The Scarlet Plague).  It could also be found in the work of biologists such as Ronald Fisher, who espoused similar concepts in The Genetical Theory of Natural Selection (1930).  The most important parts of Fisher's book, Brown writes, expounds on the theme that "civilisation is dreadfully threatened by the way the lower classes outbreed the aristocracy." Brown finds related sentiments expressed in the work of W. D. Hamilton, who believed that the "life-saving efforts of modern medicine" threatened the human genome.

See also
Dysgenics

References

Further reading
Brown, Andrew. (2012, November 13). "Why it's unlikely we are more stupid than our hunter-gatherer ancestors".  The Guardian. Retrieved December 6, 2012.
Crabtree, Gerald R. (January, 2013). "Our Fragile Intellect. Part II". Trends in Genetics. 29 (1): 3-5. . PubMed citation 
Dolan, Eric W. (2012, November 12). "Human intelligence slowly declining, says leading geneticist". The Raw Story. Retrieved December 6, 2012.
Eyres, Harry. (2013, February 2). "Scales of complexity." The Slow Lane. Financial Times.
Kalinka, Alex T.; Kelava, Iva; Lewitus, Eric (2013). "Our robust intellect". Trends in Genetics 29 (3): 125–127. .  . . Archived from the original on 2013. Retrieved 19 December 2013.
Mitchell, Kevin J. (2013). "Genetic entropy and the human intellect". Trends in Genetics 29 (2): 59–60. . . . Lay summary (19 December 2013). 
Sample, Ian. (2012, November 12). "Is pampered humanity getting steadily less intelligent?. The Guardian. Retrieved December 20, 2013.

Academic journal articles
2012 works
Genetics literature